"We Dem Boyz" is a song by American rapper Wiz Khalifa from his fifth studio album Blacc Hollywood (2014). On February 11, 2014, it was released by Rostrum Records and Atlantic Records as the album's first single. It was produced by Detail and Choppa Boi. The song peaked at number 43 of the US Billboard Hot 100 chart.

Background and composition 
On February 6, 2014, Wiz Khalifa released a 15-second preview of "We Dem Boyz", announcing its full release to come in a few days. Wiz Khalifa commented on his reasoning for releasing it as a single saying, "I like 'We Dem Boyz' as the first single because of the energy. It reaches so many audiences other than just a rap audience. It's kind of like how "Black and Yellow" was – a big sports song to get everybody riled. It's more of an anthem."

The song features a boisterous, trap influenced instrumental driven by "thunderous" drums. On top of the production, Wiz Khalifa raps with a subtly autotuned flow.

Release and promotion 
On February 10, 2014, the song was premiered through a partnership with music identifying app Shazam. When the preview video was "Shazamed", the song's full audio was unlocked on the app's feed. It was the first song to be premiered by Shazam in history. Then the following day, it was officially released as a digital download.

On February 12, 2014, Wiz Khalifa held a release party for the single in Los Angeles, California. An official video released of the party featured prominent appearances from the song's producer Detail and Taylor Gang Records artist Ty Dolla Sign. On February 19, 2014, Khalifa performed the song live during his appearance on DJ Kay Slay's Streetsweeper Radio show. His first live show performance was on February 13, 2014 on 106 &Park. Then on March 15, 2014, Khalifa performed the song during Taylor Gang's set at SXSW. His next performance of the song was on March 31, on The Arsenio Hall Show.

"We Dem Boyz" was featured in an episode of the TV series Selfie in which Karen Gillan's character twerked to it.

Critical reception 
"We Dem Boyz" was met with generally positive reviews from music critics. Complex named it the third best song of the first half of 2014. Writer Insanul Ahmed commented saying, "Driven by a distinctly trap sound and Wiz's Auto-tuned vocals, the song isn't a total overhaul of his style but it is a creative departure for Wiz. It owes more to songs like Lil Reese's "Us," Drake's "Started From the Bottom," and any number of Atlanta's warblers than the stoner raps and pop anthems that have made up much of Wiz's output. Despite the soft start, the song is a club staple now and the biggest street-oriented song Wiz has gotten to pop in years." The song was placed at number eight on Billboards 10 Best Rap Songs of 2014 list.

Music video 
The music video for "We Dem Boyz" was filmed in Atlanta, Georgia on March 11, 2014. The video was then released on April 14, 2014. It features cameo appearances by B.o.B, Big K.R.I.T., Ty Dolla Sign, Young Thug, Chevy Woods, Ty Glascoe, and Rich Homie Quan. The music video was nominated at the 2014 MTV Video Music Awards' Best Hip-Hop Video category, but lost to Drake's R&B song "Hold On, We're Going Home".

Remixes 
The official remix of "We Dem Boyz" features Rick Ross, Schoolboy Q, and Nas. It was released on July 3, 2014. On February 18, 2014, American rapper Tyga released a remix to "We Dem Boyz". Then rapper T.I. released his own remix on April 13, 2014. Busta Rhymes and his Conglomerate Records artists O.T. Genasis and J-Doe followed that by releasing a remix on May 5, 2014. Puff Daddy, Meek Mill and French Montana released their own remix on June 18, 2014. On September 11, 2014 the French rapper Rohff
release his own Remix "Où est Rohff?". On June 19, 2015 Rapper Plies released his own version of the Track titled "We Dem Boyz P-mix" which actually featured the rapper.

Usage in media 
The song was featured on the television shows Selfie, Black-ish, Empire, Ballers, Hawaii Five-O, The Mindy Project and Superstore. It was also featured in the 2015 film Southpaw. This song faced strong resurgence in late 2016, where YouTube's successful content creator EWNetwork falsely leaked the Nintendo Switch while exclaiming "JOY CON BOYZ". He has since made multiple references to this incident, connecting it to this song. It has then spawned types of merchandise related to this event and song, and a new online meme. The song is featured in video games WWE 2K15 and NBA 2K16.

The Dallas Cowboys often use the song for promotional purposes.

Awards and nominations

Commercial performance 
The song only achieved moderate commercial success and failed to outperform the lead singles from Khalifa's previous albums: in the United States, Rolling Papers lead single "Black and Yellow" peaked at number one and was certified triple Platinum, while O.N.I.F.C.'s "Work Hard, Play Hard" peaked at number 17 and was certified double platinum by the Recording Industry Association of America (RIAA).

Charts

Weekly charts

Year-end charts

Certifications

Release history

References 

2014 singles
Wiz Khalifa songs
Atlantic Records singles
Rostrum Records singles
Songs written by Detail (record producer)
Song recordings produced by Detail (record producer)
2014 songs
Dallas Cowboys
Trap music songs